Silje Katrine Waade (born 20 March 1994) is a Norwegian handball player for Vipers Kristiansand and the Norwegian national team.

She was an active track athlete until 17 years of age.

She also represented Norway in the 2013 Women's Junior European Handball Championship, placing 4th.

Achievements
European Championship
Winner: 2016
 World Youth Championship:
 Bronze Medalist: 2012
EHF Champions League:
Winner: 2020/2021, 2021/2022
Bronze medalist: 2018/2019
Norwegian League:
Winner: 2018/2019, 2019/2020, 2020/2021, 2021/2022
 Silver Medalist: 2011/2012, 2012/2013, 2013/2014
 Bronze Medalist: 2010/2011
Norwegian Cup:
Winner: 2018, 2019, 2020, 2021, 2022/23

Individual awards
 All-Star Right Wing of Golden League 2016
 Best Right Back in the month of September 2016, Grundigligaen 2016/2017

References

External links

1994 births
Living people
People from Stjørdal
Norwegian female handball players
Sportspeople from Trøndelag